90ML is a 2019 Indian Telugu-language romantic comedy film directed by Sekhar Reddy Yerra and starring Kartikeya and newcomer Neha Solanki in the lead roles. The film is produced by Ashok Reddy Gummakonda, who previously produced RX 100 (2018).

Plot 
Devadas (Karthikeya) is born with a fatal alcoholic syndrome and needs to drink 90ML liquor three times a day to survive. He falls in love with Suvasana (Neha Solanki) who hates alcohol. The twist in the tale arises when Jon Wik (Ravi Kishan) enters the love story and creates a chaos. What will Devadas do now? How will he manage his drinking problem, his lady love and the villain at the same time forms the rest of the story.

Cast 

 Kartikeya as Devadas
 Neha Solanki as Suvasana
 Ravi Kishan as Jayram (John Wick)
 Ajay as Seshu
 Rao Ramesh as Kshunaakar Rao, Suvasana's father
 Pragathi as Devadas's mother
 Satya Prakash as Ramdas, Devadas's father
 Roll Rida as Kishore
 Raghu Karumanchi as John Wick's henchman
 Prabhakar as Raja
 Posani Krishna Murali as Murali
 Ali as Dr. Nadiridinna, Rehabilitation Center
 Gundu Sudarshan as Doctor
 Praveen as Vignesh
 Thagubothu Ramesh as Ramesh
 Duvvasi Mohan
 Kalyani
 C. V. L. Narasimha Rao
 Baby Nidhi Reddy
 Nellore Sudharshan

Production 
Director Ajay of RX 100 helped Sekhar Reddy meet Kartikeya.  Television actress  Neha Solanki was signed as the lead actress with Ravi Kishan, Satya Prakash, and rapper Roll Rida playing supporting roles. Three songs were shot in Azerbaijan. The first look poster was revealed in September 2019. The film gained media coverage due to its title and first look poster. .The songs composed by Anup Rubens were well received by audience. Kartikeya plays a drunkard in the film who has a disease that requires him to drink daily. The teaser released on 21 September. The trailer released on 20 September. The film was originally scheduled to release on 5 December, but was postponed to 6 December after the film ran into issues when the Central Board of Film Certification asked the makers of the film to remove some scenes.

Soundtrack 
The music was composed by Anup Rubens and the lyrics were written by Chandrabose.

Reception 
The Deccan Chronicle gave the film one-and-a-half out of five stars and wrote that "At the end of it all, 90ML is like a bad drink". The Times of India gave the film two out of five stars and stated that "None of the scenes blend into each other. and the film just ends up seeming like a mishmash of random scenes that lead to a forced yet predictable ending". Telangana Today wrote that "While performance of Karthikeya in the lead role is somewhat laudable, the film as a whole is not more than a one-time watch".

References

External links 
 

2010s Telugu-language films
Indian romantic comedy films